Annette Grüters-Kieslich is a pediatrician with a sub specialty in endocrinology, especially childhood obesity and former dean of the Berlin University Hospital Charité.

References

External links
Curriculum Vitae Prof. Dr. Annette Grüters‐Kieslich

Living people
1954 births
Pediatric endocrinologists
Women deans (academic)
German academic administrators